Stary Dzierzgoń  is a village in Sztum County, Pomeranian Voivodeship, in northern Poland. It is the seat of the gmina (administrative district) called Gmina Stary Dzierzgoń.

Before 1772 the area was part of Kingdom of Poland, 1772-1945 was called Alt Christburg and was on the border of East Prussia and West Prussia. For the history of the region, see History of Pomerania.

The village has a population of 410.

Notable residents
 Franz Schleiff (born 1896), World War I pilot

References

Villages in Sztum County